The Sió or Sió-csatorna (Sió-Channel) is a fully regulated river in midwest Hungary. It is the outlet, at the eastern end, of Lake Balaton, flowing out of the lake in Siófok. It flows into the river Danube near the city of Szekszárd. Sió flows through the Hungarian counties Somogy, Fejér and Tolna, its main tributaries are Kapos from the right and Sárvíz from the left. The drainage basin of Sió (including Balaton) covers  more than a third of Transdanubia.

References 

Rivers of Hungary